Elachista galbina is a moth of the family Elachistidae. It is found in Kazakhstan. The habitat consists of xerothermic slopes with steppe vegetation.

The wingspan is 8.5–10 mm. The forewing ground colour is creamy white, scattered with a few black scales in the distal third and with three distinct
ochreous longitudinal lines. The basal third of the costa is black and the fringe scales are concolorous with the forewing, although some of the longer scales distally are brown or dark grey, forming a fringe line. The costal part of the hindwings is grey and the dorsal part translucent, with paler yellowish fringe scales.

References

galbina
Moths described in 2012
Moths of Asia